Phyllonorycter deschkai is a moth of the family Gracillariidae. It is known from Alps on altitudes between 500 and 1,750 meters.

There are two generations per year. The larvae feed on Amelanchier ovalis, Cotoneaster integerrimus, Cotoneaster nebrodensis, Sorbus aria and Sorbus chamaemespilus. They mine the leaves of their host plant. They create a thin lower-surface tentiform mine. Normally, there are no folds, but there may occur some indistinct folds on occasion.

References

deschkai
Moths of Europe
Moths described in 2007